Santiago Metro Line 8 it will be a new line that will form part of the Santiago Metro and will have an approximate extension of 20 kilometers, connecting the communes of Providencia on the northeast, and Puente Alto on the southeast of the Chilean capital.

It will connect with lines 1 and 6 in Los Leones, with line 3 in Chile España, and with line 4 in Macul.

Postponement of the project 
Due to the October protests in Santiago that affected the Santiago Metro, on Monday, March 9, 2020, the company declared the tenders for lines 8 and 9 void. This is largely due to the fact that the company has allocated the resources in repair the damage caused by the multiple incendiary attacks suffered by various stations in the social crisis.

Stations
Stations running from north to south.

References

External links
 Metro S.A.
 UrbanRail.net/Santiago
 Santiago Metro Track Map
 Tarjeta Bip!
 Plan and Authority of Transit of Santiago de Chile, Transantiago

Santiago Metro